Chadds Ford is a census-designated place (CDP) in Delaware and Chester counties, Pennsylvania, United States, comprising the unincorporated communities of Chadds Ford and Chadds Ford Knoll. It was first listed as a CDP prior to the 2020 census.

The CDP is in westernmost Delaware County and southeastern Chester County, in the northwest part of Chadds Ford Township, the east part of Pennsbury Township, and the south corner of Birmingham Township. Brandywine Creek runs through the center of the CDP, forming first the boundary between Pennsbury and Birmingham township and then the boundary between Chester and Delaware counties. The village of Chadds Ford is in the northwest part of Chadds Ford Township, at the junction of U.S. Route 1 and Pennsylvania Route 100, while Chadds Ford Knoll and other suburban developments are in the Chester County parts of the CDP.

U.S. Route 1 leads east-northeast  to Media and west-southwest  to Kennett Square, while Route 100 leads north  to West Chester and south  to Wilmington, Delaware.

The center of Chadds Ford village constitutes the Chadds Ford Historic District, listed on the National Register of Historic Places. The Battle of Brandywine occurred at Chadds Ford during the American Revolutionary War. Other points of interest in the CDP include the Brandywine River Museum of Art, showcasing the work of the Wyeth family; the Christian C. Sanderson Museum; and the Chaddsford Winery.

References 

Census-designated places in Delaware County, Pennsylvania
Census-designated places in Chester County, Pennsylvania
Census-designated places in Pennsylvania